Guy II de Nesle (died August 14, 1352), Lord of Mello, was a Marshal of France (1348) who was killed in the Battle of Mauron. 

Guy was the son of Jean I de Nesle (died 1352), Lord of Offemont and a grandson of Guy I of Clermont, who was killed in the Battle of the Golden Spurs (1302).

Nesle was made a Marshal of France in 1348 by King Philip VI of France and was commander of the army in Artois, Bourbonnais and Flanders during the Hundred Years' War. He was captured in 1351 by the English during the Siege of Saint-Jean-d'Angély, but released after paying a ransom.

In 1352, Nesle was co-founder, with King John II of France, of the newly created Order of the Star. In August of that same year, Nesle led a contingent of some hundred Knights of the Order into Brittany. There, near Mauron, they were surprised by a numerically superior English force. Despite having the opportunity to escape, Nesle ordered his Knights to attack, in accordance with the motto of the Order, that fleeing is never an option.
The entire force was killed, which dealt a serious blow to survival of the Order of the Star.

Guy de Nesle was married to Jeanne de Bruyères; their son was named Jean II de Nesle. Guy's grandson Guy III de Nesle was killed in the Battle of Azincourt (English: Agincourt) in 1415. His brother Guillaume, as well as his cousin Jean de Clermont (who was made Marshal of France in 1352), were killed in the Battle of Poitiers (1356).

References

Sources

1352 deaths
Marshals of France
People of the Hundred Years' War
French military personnel killed in action
Year of birth unknown
French prisoners of war in the Hundred Years' War
14th-century military history of France